Dast Jerdeh Rural District is in Chavarzaq District of Tarom County, Zanjan province, Iran. At the National Census of 2006, its population was 6,698 in 1,686 households. There were 7,309 inhabitants in 2,083 households at the following census of 2011. At the most recent census of 2016, the population of the rural district was 7,446 in 2,305 households. The largest of its 19 villages was Dast Jerdeh, with 1,169 people.

References 

Tarom County

Rural Districts of Zanjan Province

Populated places in Zanjan Province

Populated places in Tarom County